The National Mosque of Malaysia is a mosque in Kuala Lumpur, Malaysia. It has a capacity for 15,000 people and is situated among  of gardens. Its key features are a  minaret and a 16-pointed star concrete main roof. The umbrella, synonymous with the tropics, is featured conspicuously – the main roof is reminiscent of an open umbrella, the minaret's cap a folded one. The folded plates of the concrete main roof are a creative solution to achieving the larger spans required in the main gathering hall. Reflecting pools and fountains spread throughout the compound. Completed in 1965, the mosque is a bold and modern approach in reinforced concrete, symbolic of the aspirations of a then newly independent nation.

History 
Malaya gained its independence from the British government on 31 August 1957. Major development programs in areas of the economy, social, and architecture were actively implemented in line with the new government. The programs were also to portray new progressive culture and achieved democracy. Therefore, on 30 July 1957, in the meeting of the Federal Executive Council, an idea to build a national mosque as a symbol of the country's independence was mooted. In another meeting on 5 March 1958, Chief Ministers of the eleven states in the Federation of Malaya, a proposal was made to name the mosque Masjid Tunku Abdul Rahman Putra Al-Haj, in recognition of Prime Minister Tunku Abdul Rahman's efforts in guiding the country to gaining independence. However, Tunku refused this honour; on the contrary, he named it Masjid Negara in thanksgiving for the country's peaceful independence without bloodshed.

The mosque was built on the former site of a church, the Venning Road Brethren Gospel Hall, which was acquired by the government in 1961. The church was offered land on Jalan Imbi as a replacement and is now known as Jalan Imbi Chapel. The original structure of the mosque was designed by a three-person team from the Public Works Department: UK architect Howard Ashley, and Malaysians  and Baharuddin Kassim. The engineer in charge of the construction of the mosque, which commenced in 1963 was Antony Morris. On Friday, 27 August 1965, the mosque was declared open by the third Yang di-Pertuan Agong, the late Tuanku Syed Putra of Perlis.

The mosque underwent major renovations in 1987, and the once-pink concrete roof is now clad in green and blue tiles. Today, Masjid Negara continues to stand sleek and stylish against the Kuala Lumpur skyline. An underground passage leads to the National Mosque located near the railway station, along Jalan Sultan Hishamuddin. Its unique modern design embodies a contemporary expression of traditional Islamic art calligraphy and ornamentation. Near the mosque is the Makam Pahlawan (Heroes' Mausoleum), a burial ground of several Malaysian Muslim leaders. Makam Pahlawan is a 7-pointed star concrete roofed structure.

On 27 August 2015, Masjid Negara celebrated its Golden Jubilee (50th anniversary).

Imams of the National Mosque
 Ghazali Abdullah (1965)
 Mohs Salleh Hassan Farid
 Sheikh Abdul Mohsein bin Salleh (1974-1975)
 Ahmad Shahir bin Daud (1975-1980)
 Abu Hassan bin Din Al-Hafiz (1981-1983)
 Ahmad Shahir bin Daud (1984-1992)
 Arifin Harun (1992-1993)
 Taib Azamudden bin Md. Taib (1993-1999)
 A. Jalil bin Sindring @ Prangerang (1999-Sep. 2001)
 Wan Halim bin Wan Harun (2001-2004)
 Kamaruddin bin Zakaria (2005-2006)
 Tan Sri Dato' Sri Haji Ismail bin Haji Muhammad (February 2007 – 2019)
 Haji Ehsan bin Mohd Hosni (February 2020 – present)

Transportation
The mosque is accessible within walking distance of Kuala Lumpur railway station, served by the KTM Komuter, and  station, served by the Kelana Jaya and Kajang metro lines.

The free Go KL City Bus (Red Line) has a stop at Masjid Negara.

See also
 Timeline of Islamic history
 Islamic architecture
 Islamic art
 List of mosques
 Islam in Malaysia
 Istiqlal Mosque, Jakarta — The national mosque of Indonesia

References

External links

 National Mosque of Malaysia (Masjid Negara) website
 KL Heritage Trail: Masjid Negara−National Mosque

Mosques in Kuala Lumpur
Mosques completed in 1965
1965 establishments in Malaysia
Modernist architecture in Malaysia